Dumord is a village in the Saint-Jean-du-Sud commune of the Port-Salut Arrondissement, in the Sud department of Haiti.

See also
Saint-Jean-du-Sud, for a list of other settlements in the commune.

References

Populated places in Sud (department)